Digital Film Makers Forum is a public charitable trust registered as a non-profit organisation in India for the promotion of digital films based on Thrissur, Kerala. It is an affiliated Organization to Kerala Sangeetha Nataka Akademi and is organized by a group of amateur filmmakers in Thrissur.

Aim 
The trust mainly Proposes to make and distribute of all types of legally valid digital movies. And, it is aimed also to conduct digital film festivals, promote budding filmmakers and other social activities.

Activities 
The trust was inaugurated by Padma Shri Kalamandalam Kshemavathy on 5 June 2011 at Kerala Sahitya Akademi.
 In 2012, produced the documentary film, Laloorinu Parayanullathu associated with Joseph Paneagaden.
 On 19 February 2013, a protest was held by the trust against the termination of Sree Rama Varma Music School in Thrissur.
 On 29–30 August 2013, a film festival named as D.F.M.F Short Film Festival was held.
 On 14 January 2018, conducted 'Oormmappookkal', a Remembrance program of I.V. Sasi, an Indian cine director and Prof.K.B. Unnithan, was chief patron of the trust.

Administration

Administrators 
 Chairman: Sathish Kalathil
 Vice Chairman: K.B. Sunil Kumar
 Managing Director: Adv.P.K. Sajeev
 Treasurer: Saju Pulikottil

Trustees 
 Dr.B. Jayakrishnan 
 B. Ashok Kumar 
 Bhasi Pangil 
 Ajeesh M Vijayan

Sub Committees 
Baburaj Puthur (Singer) and Sathyan Laloor (social activist) are patrons of the trust. V.R. Rajamohan (senior journalist) is the chief adviser and Ex-M.L.A T.V. Chandramohan,  Actress C. Rema Devi are the counselors of advisory board. Prof.K.B. Unnithan (Late) was the chief patron of the trust.

References

External links 

 Official Website
 Digital Film Makers Forum Trust 
 Reports of S.R.V music school issue
 ഡി എഫ് എം എഫ് ഷോർട് ഫിലിം ഫെസ്റ്റിവൽ

Organizations established in 2011
Organisations based in Kerala
Non-profit organisations based in India
2011 establishments in Kerala